Karl Anton Hickel (1745 – 30 October 1798) was an 18th-century Austrian painter.

Life 
Hickel was born in Česká Lípa, Bohemia, and enrolled in the Academy of Fine Arts Vienna in Vienna, Austria in 1758. After graduation, he worked as a painter under his brother, Joseph Hickel, who was also a painter. Beginning in 1779, he served as a traveling portrait painter. He spent considerable time in Munich where he painted Charles Theodore, Elector of Bavaria, among others. He then traveled in southern Germany, Switzerland, then to Mannheim and Mainz. He moved to Switzerland in 1785, and then became the official court painter of Joseph II, Holy Roman Emperor. In 1786, he travelled to France where he painted under the patronage of Marie Antoinette and Marie-Louise, princesse de Lamballe. He died in Hamburg.

Gallery

References 
 Article at Answers.com
 Constantin von Wurzbach: Hickel, Anton. In: Biographical Dictionary of the Empire of Austria. Volume 9, published by L. C. Zamarski, Vienna, 1863, pp. 2 f
 Liselotte Popelka: Hickel, Anton. In: New German Biography (NDB). Volume 9, Duncker & Humblot, Berlin 1972, p.105 (digitized).
 Hamburg artist lexicon, The Visual Artists Vol 1, Edit. of a Committees of the Society of Hamburg History, Hoffmann und Campe, Hamburg, 1854, p 113, (online Hamburg State and University Library).
 Friedrich Johann Lorenz Meyer, sketches for a painting of Hamburg, Verlag Friedrich Hermann Nestler, Hamburg, 1801, Volume 1, Issue 3, SS 275 et seq, (online State and University Library Hamburg)

1745 births
1798 deaths
People from Český Krumlov
German Bohemian people
18th-century Austrian painters
18th-century Austrian male artists
Austrian male painters
Austrian portrait painters
Austrian people of German Bohemian descent
Court painters
Academy of Fine Arts Vienna alumni